Reed Creek is a tributary to the Smith River in the United States state of Virginia. Reed Creek is in the Streams category for Henry County, Virginia. Reed Creek is displayed on the Martinsville West USGS quad topo map for Martinsville, Virginia. Reed Creek is also displayed on the USGS quad maps for Bassett, Virginia and Snow Creek, Virginia.

"In the mid-1700s, the forts of Mayo and Trial were built as part of a line of forts constructed to protect the settlers from Indians throughout the colonies. Fort Trial was on the Smith River, at the mouth of Reed Creek, near the town that today is called Martinsville. George Washington visited both of these remote outposts during his 1756 inspection of frontier forts."

See also
List of rivers of Virginia

References

Bibliography
USGS Geographic Names Information Service
USGS Hydrologic Unit Map - State of Virginia (1974)

Rivers of Virginia